The 2018–19 UTEP Miners women's basketball team represents the University of Texas at El Paso during the 2018–19 NCAA Division I women's basketball season. The Miners, led by second year head coach Kevin Baker, play their home games at Don Haskins Center and were members of Conference USA. They finished the season 9–22, 5–11 in C-USA play to finish in eleventh place. They advanced to the quarterfinals of the C-USA women's tournament where they lost to Middle Tennessee.

Roster

Schedule

|-
!colspan=9 style=| Exhibition

|-
!colspan=9 style=| Non-conference regular season

|-
!colspan=9 style=| Conference USA regular season

|-
!colspan="9" style=| C-USA Women's Tournament

Rankings
2018–19 NCAA Division I women's basketball rankings

See also
2018–19 UTEP Miners men's basketball team

References

UTEP Miners women's basketball seasons
UTEP